Levan Gachechiladze (born 20 July 1964) is a Georgian politician and businessman who ran as the main opposition candidate in the 5 January 2008 Georgian presidential election.

Life and family
Gachechiladze currently lives in Tbilisi, the city where he was born. He was educated at Tbilisi Ivane Javakhishvili State University with a degree in mathematics and economics.  
He is married, with three children.
His brother is the popular Georgian showman and TV show producer Giorgi Gachechiladze, known as Utsnobi (literally: "unknown" or "stranger").

Business activities
Levan Gachechiladze's rise to fame started with first of its kind Franco-Georgian wine alliance, which he secured between his company Georgian Wines & Spirits and French Pernod Ricard during the very volatile post-soviet years for Georgia. Gachechiladze's vision for transforming the industry included raising prices on largely overlooked Georgian wines and spearheading their distribution throughout Europe, and with backing of the wine business powerhouse Pernod Ricard he achieved just that. Receiving two rounds of financing amounting to $150 thousand and $5+ million over the span of several years, Gachechiladze secured cross-border capital investment that at that time was unprecedented both in significance and size. The ultimate result of his effort was introduction of market economy mindset to the Georgian wine industry and its eventual shift towards quality and premium-priced produce.

For his achievements, Gachechiladze was named Businessman of the Year and Georgian Wines & Spirits was named Company of the Year in 1999. Gachechiladze's personal wealth is estimated to be $USD10 million.

Currently Gachechiladze is involved with multiple businesses and lobbying activities. Together with his brother, he is also the owner of TV Station Maestro.

Political career
In 1999, Gachechiladze became member of ruling Union of Citizens of Georgia party led by president Eduard Shevardnadze in party's group of "new faces" for election. In same year, Gachechiladze  became member of parliament from district 2. In September 2000 he left the ruling party and co-founded the 'New Faction', a group led by David Gamkrelidze.  In June 2001, when the New Faction was absorbed into a new group called the New Rights Party (NRP), Gachechiladze became chairman of the new group.

Gachechiladze had previously served as chairman of the Economic Policy Committee, and in this capacity initiated numerous reforms targeted at transitioning the country from planned to market economy.

Gachechiladze was involved in the demonstrations held in Tbilisi in November 2007. He was one of four activists who began a hunger strike to demand early parliamentary elections. He was also injured during the protests.

Candidacy in 2008 presidential elections
On 12 November 2007 Gachechiladze was named as a candidate for the January 2008 Georgian presidential election. His candidacy was supported by the 'Joint Opposition', a coalition of some ten opposition parties:
 Republican Party
 Conservative Party of Georgia
 Georgia's Way
 People's Front
 Freedom Movement
 Movement for United Georgia
 National Forum
 Georgian Troupe
 On Our Own Party

On 5 January 2008 the Georgian presidential election was held nationwide with the exception of highland village Shatili, where the polling station was not opened due to a heavy snowstorm. The earliest exit polls, carried out by the group of non-governmental organisations and mass-media, suggested the victory of Mikheil Saakashvili with more than half of all the votes (52.5%). Official results according to Central Election Committee were 53.47% in favor of Saakashvili and 25.69% in favor of Levan Gachechiladze. What is notable though is that in Tbilisi district Gachechiladze received 43.65% of votes as opposed to Saakashvili's 35.12%, winning by far the largest district and the most educated population's vote. Despite announced Saakashvili's victory, Joint Opposition, all other opposition candidates and number of NGOs declared the elections rigged and stated that police force was used to support this process. Similar developments took place during 2008 parliament elections, that being the reason for Levan Gachechiladze and several of his supporters to decline entry into the parliament.

Late political career
Gachechiladze led 2009 and May 2010 protest with family members, which eventually weakened Saakashvili's power and ultimately led to its handover to the opposition in 2012.

References

1964 births
Living people
Politicians from Tbilisi
Businesspeople from Tbilisi
Members of the Parliament of Georgia
New Rights Party politicians